MyPaint is a free and open-source raster graphics editor for digital painting. It is available for Windows, macOS, and Unix-like operating systems.

History
MyPaint versions up to 1.00 and bug/issue tracking were hosted by Gna!.

MyPaint uses graphical control elements from GTK and, since 1.2.0, uses GTK 3.

In 2020 MyPaint 2.0.0 release succeeds MyPaint 1.2, released back in 2017, and brings a stack of new features and improved tools with it.

Features
Among MyPaint's capabilities are:
 Pressure-sensitive graphics tablet support
 Dynamic brush library, standalone for integration into third-party applications
 Layer management
 Simple interface
 Gamut masking color wheel
 "Unlimited" canvas not requiring predetermination of image size
 Symmetry Modes
 Python 3 support
 Integrated bug reporting
 Supports graphics tablets made by Wacom, and similar devices

libmypaint

MyPaint has a custom procedural brush engine optimized for use with pressure-sensitive graphics tablets. In later MyPaint versions, the engine was broken out into the separately maintained libmypaint library to make it easier to integrate into other applications.

MyPaint's brush library is available as a Krita plugin, and also GIMP has support for MyPaint brushes by default.

Media attention
MyPaint was used by David Revoy, the art director of Sintel (the third computer-animated film by the Blender Foundation).

Native file format
The Adobe PSD file format changed its license in 2006, and it is now only permitted to develop applications using it in order to interact with Adobe software. As a result, a comprehensive graphics design format, OpenRaster, was developed based on the Open Document format. MyPaint uses Open Raster as its default format, but also supports saving images to PNG or JPEG.

References

External links

 
 
 

2005 software
Free raster graphics editors
Free software programmed in C++
Free software programmed in Python
Graphics software that uses GTK
Raster graphics editors for Linux